Keinstirschia is a genus of fungi in the order Diaporthales, class Sordariomycetes. The relationship of this taxon to other taxa within the order is unknown (incertae sedis). A monotypic genus, Keinstirschia contains the single species Keinstirschia megalosperma, originally described as Cryptosporella megalosperma by German mycologist Wilhelm Kirschstein in 1939.

References

Monotypic Sordariomycetes genera
Diaporthales